North Lincolnshire is a unitary authority area in Lincolnshire, England, with a population of 167,446 in the 2011 census.  The borough includes the towns of Scunthorpe, Brigg, Haxey, Crowle, Epworth, Bottesford, Kirton in Lindsey and Barton-upon-Humber. North Lincolnshire is part of the Yorkshire and Humber region.

North Lincolnshire was formed following the abolition of Humberside County Council in 1996, when four unitary authorities replaced it, North Lincolnshire and North East Lincolnshire, on the south bank of the Humber Estuary, and the East Riding of Yorkshire and Kingston upon Hull on the north bank.

It is home to the Haxey Hood, a traditional event which takes place in Haxey on 6 January, a large football scrum where a leather tube (the "hood") is pushed to one of four pubs, where it remains until next year's game.

In 2015, North Lincolnshire Council began discussions with the other nine authorities in the Greater Lincolnshire area as part of a devolution bid. If successful this would see greater powers over education, transport, health, crime and social care being devolved from central government.

Location

The  council area lies on the south side of the Humber Estuary and consists mainly of agricultural land, including land on either side of the River Trent. It borders onto North East Lincolnshire, Lincolnshire, South Yorkshire, Nottinghamshire and the East Riding of Yorkshire. The council's administrative base is at the Civic Centre in Scunthorpe.

History of area

Before the creation of Humberside in 1974, it was part of Lincolnshire, becoming North Lincolnshire only in 1996, on the abolition of Humberside. Until 1 April 1996, the area had been part of Humberside. The district was formed by a merger of the boroughs of Glanford and Scunthorpe, and southern Boothferry.

Towns and villages
Alkborough, Althorpe, Amcotts, Appleby, Ashby
Barrow Haven, Barrow upon Humber, Barnetby le Wold, Barton on Humber, Belton, Beltoft, Bonby, Bottesford, Brigg, Broughton, Burringham, Burton upon Stather
Cadney, Coleby, Crowle, Croxton
Dragonby
Ealand, East Butterwick, East Halton, Eastoft, Elsham, Epworth, Epworth Turbary
Flixborough, Fockerby, Ferriby Sluice
Gainsthorpe, Garthorpe, Goxhill, Grasby, Gunness
Haxey, Hibaldstow, Horkstow, Howsham
Keadby, Keelby, Kingsforth, Kirmington, Kirton in Lindsey
Luddington
Manton, Melton Ross, Messingham, Mill Place
New Holland, North Killingholme
Owston Ferry
Redbourne, Roxby
Sandtoft, Santon, Saxby All Saints, Scawby with Sturton, Scunthorpe, South End, South Killingholme, South Ferriby
Thornton Curtis
Ulceby, Ulceby Skitter
Walcot, Westwoodside, West Butterwick, West Halton, Whitton, Winteringham, Winterton, Wootton, Worlaby, Wrawby, Wressle
Yaddlethorpe

Politics

The Labour Party took control of the council, with a majority of 1, from the Conservatives after the 2007 election where the Labour Party had 22 councillors elected. The Conservative Party held 18 seats, the Liberal Democrats held 1 seat and the Independents held two seats. After the 2011 election, the Conservatives regained control of the council with 23 seats, the Labour Party falling to 20 seats.

The area is represented in parliament by three MPs. At the 2010 election the Labour Party retained the Scunthorpe seat and the Conservative Party won the Brigg and Goole seat and the Cleethorpes seat which includes the Barton area.

North Lincolnshire operates under a Cabinet and Leader form of governance. The cabinet has eight members from the largest political party elected to the cabinet by the council of 43. Cabinet members make decisions on their portfolio individually.

Economy
This is a chart of trend of regional gross value added of North and North East Lincolnshire at current basic prices published (pp. 240–253) by Office for National Statistics with figures in millions of British Pounds Sterling. 2004 onwards published (pp. 139) in 2007

Eastern Airways has its head office in the Schiphol House on the grounds of Humberside Airport in Kirmington, North Lincolnshire. Scunthorpe is the home of the British Steel owned Appleby-Frodingham steel plant, one of the largest and most successful plants in Europe. Port operations, green energy, logistics, agriculture and food processing are important elements of the areas employment profile.

Education

Gallery

References

 
Unitary authority districts of England
Local government districts of Yorkshire and the Humber
Non-metropolitan districts of Lincolnshire
Boroughs in England